Scoveston Fort, on the northern shore of Milford Haven, Pembrokeshire, Wales, U.K., is a Grade II Listed Building which belongs to a series of forts built as part of the inner line of defence of the Haven following the Royal Commission on the Defence of the United Kingdom.  Built on high ground to the north east of the town of Milford Haven, it commands excellent views of the surrounding countryside, and was the only fort around the Haven to be built inland.

The original recommendation from the commission was to build 6 defensive forts to protect the Haven from attacks from the north.  Following a review by government, this was reduced to the site at Scoveston only, which would protect the towns of Milford Haven and Neyland. Construction commenced in 1861 and completed in 1864 at a cost of £45,462. The structure is hexagonal, surrounded by a 36-foot-wide escarpment. It is surrounded by a rampart with a caponier on each corner. The rear face was defended by an earthen bank, and a large traverse was erected across the length of the interior parade ground. Entrance to the fort is via a drawbridge and a tunnel through a small gorge.

The fort was designed as a garrison for 128 men, and was designed to have a complement of 32 guns. Cost and the declining requirement for forts in the twentieth century meant that guns were never installed. It was never garrisoned, and was used mainly as a training camp for volunteers and militia. World War I saw increased activity in the fort.  In order to protect the dockyards of Milford Haven, Neyland and Pembroke Dock, a complex system of trenches was built in the land surrounding the fort to ward against land based attack.  The trench system ran from Waterston to Llangwm.

During World War II, it was used as an air raid shelter by residents of Neyland.  It was later used as a warehouse to store munitions in readiness for D-Day. During peacetime, it was left empty, under the care of a single caretaker. It was revealed following his conviction that serial killer John Cooper had visited the fort and had deposited items which he had stolen from nearby properties, and implements he had used to restrain victims. In August 2005, a local doctor committed suicide close to the fort. The fort is currently in an overgrown state, and not accessible to the public.

References

External links
Victorian Forts data sheet
www.DerelictPlaces.co.uk – Fort Scoveston, Pembrokeshire

Forts in Pembrokeshire
Grade II listed buildings in Pembrokeshire
History of Pembrokeshire
Ruins in Wales
Grade II listed forts
Palmerston Forts
Buildings and structures in Milford Haven
Scheduled monuments in Pembrokeshire